William E. Bentley is the Robert E. Fischell Distinguished Professor of Engineering, founding Director of the Fischell Institute for Biomedical Devices, and Director of the Maryland Technology Enterprise Institute located in the A. James Clark School of Engineering at the University of Maryland. He was previously the Chair of the Fischell Department of Bioengineering, where he assisted in establishing the department and provided leadership that led to its nationally ranked status.

Dr. Bentley is also appointed in the Department of Chemical and Biomolecular Engineering at the University of Maryland, College Park and the Institute for Bioscience and Biotechnology Research. He has served on advisory committees and panels for the NIH, NSF, DOD, DOE, USDA, and several state agencies. He has mentored over 25 Ph.D.s, some of whom are academics at: Cornell University (x2), University of Colorado, Clemson University, University of Connecticut, Tufts University, Postech (Korea), and National Tsing Hua University (Taiwan).

Education
Dr. Bentley received his undergraduate (BS, '82) and Master of Engineering degrees ('83) from Cornell University and his Ph.D. ('89) from the University of Colorado, Boulder, all in chemical engineering.

Dr. Bentley worked for the International Paper Company, on alternative fuels and recovery process improvement.

Research
At Maryland since 1989, Dr. Bentley has focused his research on the development of molecular tools that facilitate the expression of biologically active proteins, having authored over 200 related archival publications. Recent interests are on deciphering and manipulating signal transduction pathways, including those of bacterial communication networks, for altering cell phenotype.

He was an integral component in the creation of the Bioprocess Scale-Up Facility (BSF) at the University of Maryland. While associated with the BSF, the facility performed contract research projects for MedImmune (Synagis) and Martek (Life's DHA)

Awards and achievements
 Distinguished University Professor (UMD)
 Robert E. Fischell Distinguished Professor
 Herbert Rabin Distinguished Professor (former)
 University System of Maryland (USM) Regents' Faculty Award for Research/Scholarship/Creative Activity (2011)
 Vice President At-Large, American Institute for Medical and Biological Engineering, 2011-2014
 U.S. EPA, Scientific and Technological Achievement Award, Level II (2010)
 Member, Advisory Council, Dept. of Chemical and Biomolecular Engineering, Cornell University (2008-2011)
 Member, Departmental Advisory Committee, Department of Biomedical Engineering, Cornell University (2009-2012)
 Member, International Scientific Advisory Board, Austrian Center of Industrial Biotechnology (ACIB) (2009)
 Elected Member, Managing Board, Society for Biological Engineers (2008)
 Fellow, American Academy of Microbiology (AAM)
 Fellow, American Association for the Advancement of Science
 Fellow, American Institute for Medical and Biological Engineering
 Schering-Plough Young Investigator Award (1996)
 Dow Outstanding New Faculty Award from the American Society for Engineering Education (1995)
 Best Abstract Award (with D.M. Ramirez), Society of Industrial Microbiology (1993)
 Research Initiation Award, National Science Foundation. (1990)
 Society of Industrial Microbiology Outstanding Achievement in Engineering Sciences Award
 Washington Academy of Sciences Allen C. Davis Medal
 Maryland's Outstanding Young Engineer, Maryland Science Center
 Mentor of Team BioCHIPS, Gemstone Honors Program, University of Maryland

References

External links
"William E Bentley" Scientific Commons
"The Bentley Group" The Maryland Biochip Collaborative
"Biomolecular & Metabolic Engineering Laboratories" University of Maryland Biotechnology Institute

Living people
University of Colorado alumni
University of Maryland, College Park faculty
21st-century American engineers
Biological engineering
1960 births
Fellows of the American Institute for Medical and Biological Engineering
Fellows of the American Association for the Advancement of Science